Sonia Gaskin (born 4 October 1994) is a Barbadian middle-distance runner specialising in the 800 metres. She won a bronze medal at the 2018 Central American and Caribbean Games. In addition, she won multiple medals in regional age group competitions.

International competitions

Personal bests
Outdoor
400 metres – 52.72 (Lubbock 2014)
800 metres – 2:02.60 (Toronto 2019)
1500 metres – 4:26.37 (Toronto 2019)

Indoor
400 metres – 54.67 (Albuquerque 2014)
800 metres – 2:07.80 (Fayetteville 2015)
1000 metres – 2:50.99 (Toronto 2019)

References

1994 births
Living people
Barbadian female middle-distance runners
Pan American Games competitors for Barbados
Athletes (track and field) at the 2015 Pan American Games
Athletes (track and field) at the 2019 Pan American Games
Central American and Caribbean Games medalists in athletics